Hiwassee Dam is a hydroelectric dam on the Hiwassee River in Cherokee County, in the U.S. state of North Carolina. It is one of three dams on the river owned and operated by the Tennessee Valley Authority, which built the dam in the late 1930s to bring flood control and electricity to the region. At , Hiwassee Dam is the third highest dam in the TVA system, behind only Fontana and Watauga. The dam and associated infrastructure was listed on the National Register of Historic Places in 2017.

Hiwassee Dam is named after the Hiwassee River.  The river's name is derived from the Cherokee word for savanna, or large meadow. Two of the tribe's towns along the river in the 18th century were also called Hiwassee.

Location
The Hiwassee River flows northwestward from its source in Towns County, Georgia through Western North Carolina, where it proceeds to slice a scenic valley through the southern Appalachian Mountains en route to its mouth along Chickamauga Lake in Tennessee.

Hiwassee Dam and its reservoir are surrounded by the Nantahala National Forest.

Hiwassee Village, a small community that developed alongside the dam and reservoir, is located immediately south of Hiwassee Dam.  North Carolina State Highway 1314 (Hiwassee Dam Access Road) crosses the top of the dam.

Capacity

Pumped storage
In the 1950s, TVA began experiments with pumped storage at Hiwassee Dam. It used an energy-generating turbine that was run in reverse during low-demand hours to pump water from below the dam into the upper reservoir. This integration of pump and turbine was the first of its kind in the United States; further, at the time it was the largest and most powerful in the world. The "pump-turbine" at Hiwassee is designated as a "National Historic Mechanical Engineering Landmark" by the American Society of Mechanical Engineers (ASME).

Background and construction

The hydroelectric potential of the Hiwassee River has been recognized since the early 1900s.  The cities of Andrews and Murphy in North Carolina had already established minor dams with generating capacities along the river when major power companies began planning large-scale hydro projects in the valley in the 1920s.  The Carolina-Tennessee Power Company (later reorganized as the Southern States Power Company) purchased  of land and flowage rights along the river in 1924 in hopes of building a large dam just above the present dam site, but the project was never fully developed.

The Tennessee Valley Authority, created as a New Deal measure in 1933 during the Franklin D. Roosevelt administration, was given oversight of flood control operations in the Tennessee River watershed, which included the Hiwassee.  It also intended to develop hydroelectric projects to generate electricity for the rural region. One of TVA's first initiatives was to control flooding on the Hiwassee River, the waters of which contributed to regular seasonal flooding in the city of Chattanooga.  Congress authorized the construction of Hiwassee Dam in 1935, and work began the following year.  Southern States Power agreed to sell its Hiwassee tract to TVA, although the two entities bickered over the land's value in federal court until 1944, when TVA agreed to a final price of $250,000.

Eight new bridges were constructed, and a Southern Railway trestle required modification. Several changes were necessary to protect the city of Murphy's riverfront, mainly at its main bridge and filtering plant.

Hiwassee Dam's height required a large mass of concrete which engineers feared would trap heat during its setting, making the dam more vulnerable to cracks. The blocks' joints were formed with shear keys, and pipes were installed to allow future grouting should it become necessary. Several practices were employed to avoid trapping heat in the setting of the concrete, including the use of low-heat cement.

Hiwassee Dam's gates were closed on February 8, 1940, although minor construction work continued until later that same year.  The first generator went online May 21, 1940.  The dam's final price tag was just over $24 million.  Shortly after the project's completion, TVA transferred  of its Hiwassee property reservation to the U.S. Forest Service for inclusion in the Nantahala National Forest.

In 1952 unit 2 was added, an integration of pump and turbine built by Allis-Chalmers Company. After the electrical system for the pump failed in 2011, it remained offline until being repaired in 2016.

References

External links

Hiwassee Reservoir — official TVA site
Scrapbooks of Edgar F. Pohlmann, Engineering Aide, Hiwassee Dam, TVA

Dams on the Hiwassee River
Tennessee Valley Authority dams
Buildings and structures in Cherokee County, North Carolina
Dams in North Carolina
Hydroelectric power plants in North Carolina
Dams completed in 1940
Energy infrastructure completed in 1940
National Register of Historic Places in Cherokee County, North Carolina
Dams on the National Register of Historic Places in North Carolina
Historic districts in North Carolina
Pumped-storage hydroelectric power stations
1940 establishments in North Carolina